Peace and Diversity Academy was a New York City public high school located in the Longwood neighborhood of the Bronx.

Educational institutions established in 2004
Public high schools in the Bronx
2004 establishments in New York City